Jan Narveson  (born 1936) is professor of philosophy emeritus at the University of Waterloo, in Waterloo, Ontario, Canada. An anarcho-capitalist and contractarian, Narveson's ideology is deeply influenced by the thought of Robert Nozick and David Gauthier.

Biography
Narveson was born in Erskine, Minnesota, United States. He studied at the University of Chicago where he obtained a BA in political science and in philosophy; he then spent a year at the University of Oxford on a traveling fellowship before earning a PhD at Harvard University in 1961. His libertarian views have evolved from dissatisfaction with utilitarianism.

A prolific author, Narveson has written hundreds of essays, reviews and articles for publication. A critic of Marxism, he is also known at the University of Waterloo for taking part in many on-campus debates. In 2002 he published Respecting Persons in Theory and Practice (2002), a collection of his most influential essays spanning the length of his career. His most recent work is You and the State: A Short Introduction to Political Philosophy. Narveson is a long-time member of the Ontario Libertarian Party, and is currently a member of its Ethics Committee.

Apart from his libertarian work, he is the founder/president of the Kitchener-Waterloo Chamber Music Society, a long-running venue for classical chamber music.

In 2003, Narveson was made an Officer of the Order of Canada by past Governor-General of Canada, Adrienne Clarkson.

Narveson was the founding Chairman and President of the Institute for Liberal Studies, and since 2016 has been Chairman Emeritus.

Criticism of animal rights

Narveson is a noted opponent of animal rights and one of Tom Regan's severe critics. He has defended a contractarian account of morality in which only agents capable of agreeing to obligations and social rules have moral standing, therefore animals cannot have rights. Under contractarian ethics all moral obligations derive from mutual agreement between different parties but as animals can not understand the terms of an agreement nor demand duties from humans then the life and welfare of the animal is only relevant as they matter to human interests.

Selected publications

 Morality and Utility, Johns Hopkins University Press, 1967.
 Moral Issues, Oxford University Press, 1983.
 A Case Against Animal Rights, Moorhead State University, 1986.
 Political Correctness: For and Against co-authored with Marilyn Friedman, Rowman & Littlefield, 1995.
 Moral Matters, 2nd ed., Broadview Press, 1999.
 The Libertarian Idea, Paperback edition (with new preface). Broadview Press, 2001. (Orig. pub.: Temple University Press, 1988)
 Respecting Persons in Theory and Practice: Essays on Moral and Political Philosophy, Rowman & Littlefield, 2002.
 You and the State, 2008.
 This is Ethical Theory, Open Court, 2010.
 Are Liberty and Equality Compatible?, Cambridge University Press, 2010.

See also

 List of University of Waterloo people

Notes

External links
 Homepage of Jan Narveson at the Univ. of Waterloo
 Criticism of Narveson's Libertarianism by G. A. Cohen
 An interview with Jan Narveson about the philosophy of Robert Nozick  by Peter Jaworski
 A review of Narveson's The Libertarian Idea and Respecting Persons in Theory and Practice
 A debate between Narveson and Gary Francione on Radio Netherlands on the issue of animal rights.

1936 births
Living people
Alumni of the University of Oxford
American anarcho-capitalists
American anti-communists
American libertarians
Canadian anti-communists
Canadian libertarians
Canadian philosophers
Canadian political philosophers
Critics of animal rights
Harvard University alumni
Libertarian theorists
Officers of the Order of Canada
University of Chicago alumni
Academic staff of the University of Waterloo